ST5 may refer to:

Space Technology 5, a NASA test of ten new microsatellite technologies
Star Trek V: The Final Frontier, an American science fiction film
Starship Troopers: Traitor of Mars, fifth film in the Starship Troopers film series
ST5 (gene), a protein

See also
 STV (disambiguation)